Amble railway station was the terminus of the Amble branch line, which diverged from the East Coast Main Line at Chevington in  Northumberland, Northern England. The branch opened in 1849 and closed to passengers in  1930.  The station remained open for goods and coal until final closure in 1969.

History

Opened by the North Eastern Railway, it became part of the London and North Eastern Railway during the Grouping of 1923. The station closed to passengers seven years later, but the goods service then passed on to the North Eastern Region of British Railways on nationalisation in 1948. It was then withdrawn  by the British Railways Board.

The station has been demolished and the site is now a public carpark.

References 

 
 
 
 
 Station on navigable O.S. map

External links

Disused railway stations in Northumberland
Former North Eastern Railway (UK) stations
Railway stations in Great Britain opened in 1849
Railway stations in Great Britain closed in 1969
1849 establishments in England
Amble